24 km Gorkovskoy zheleznoy dorogi (Gorkijyse Kürťygornyn 24-še km) is a rural locality (a settlement) in Obshiyarskoye Rural Settlement of Volzhsky District, Russia. The population was 1 as of 2010.

Geography 
The settlement is located 16 km north of Volzhsk (the district's administrative centre) by road. Emekovo is the nearest rural locality.

Streets 
 24 km. GZD. Kilometr

References 

Rural localities in Mari El